Saint-Remy-sur-Bussy (literally Saint-Remy on Bussy) is a commune in the Marne department in north-eastern France.

See also
Communes of the Marne department

References

Saintremysurbussy